Cirebon Sundanese (also referred as Sundanese of Cirebonan) is a variety of conversation in Sundanese in the ex-Residency of Cirebon and its surroundings, which includes Kuningan, Majalengka, Cirebon, Indramayu and Subang as well as Brebes in Central Java.

Cirebon Sundanese includes a wide variety of conversations or dialects from Sundanese in the Northeast region (Kuningan), Sundanese in the Middle-East region (Majalengka) and several varieties of Sundanese dialects which are directly adjacent to the cultural land of Javanese culture or Cirebonan culture, for example the variety of language conversations. Sunda Parean and Sunda Lea in the Kandang Haur and Lelea Subdistricts in Indramayu Regency which are directly adjacent to the Cirebon-Indramayuan cultural land which uses the Cirebon Indramayuan dialect or the variety of conversations in the Binong Sundanese language in Binong District which is also directly influenced by the Cirebon-Indramayuan dialect. and the Banyumas Javanese language brought by immigrants from Tegal and Brebes in the early 20th century via the Tegal-Brebes railway to the western region of Indramayu and its surroundings, so that in the Binong Sundanese conversation, the term "Nyong" (to mention the word "I") and the term "Wong" (to mention the word "person") is known.

Vocabulary 
The following is the vocabulary of various conversations in Sundanese Cirebon language.

(*) Sundanese Kuningan or the Northeastern dialect includes the variety of Sundanese language used in the East Cirebon Regency and the western and southern Brebes Regencies, see the Sundanese variety of the Northeastern dialect in Brebes

References

Bibliography

External links

Austronesian languages
Sundanese language
Dialects of Sundanese